China 9, Liberty 37 ("Love, Lead, and Fury") is an Italian-Spanish 1978 Western film directed by Monte Hellman, starring Warren Oates, Jenny Agutter, and Fabio Testi. Noted director Sam Peckinpah has a small, rare acting role. The film was shot in locations in Spain and Italy  by cinematographer   Giuseppe Rotunno. Pino Donaggio composed the musical score. The English title refers to a crossroads sign seen at the beginning of the movie. The film had a very sparse theatrical release in the United States, and did not play in some cities until as late as 1984.

Plot
Gunslinger Clayton Drumm is in jail, about to be hanged, when railroad company men offer him a chance to live if he will agree to murder Matthew Sebanek, a miner who has steadfastly refused to sell his land to the railroad. Instead, Drumm befriends Sebanek and has an affair with Sebanek's wife. Sebanek discovers the affair and joins with the railroad men to hunt down the couple.

Cast

Versions
A 102-minute DVD release was made by Synergy Ent on 29 May 2007.

The full 98-minute director's cut, containing nudity, in English language and original scope, has been broadcast by TCM.

Clips of the film can be seen in the documentary Z Channel: A Magnificent Obsession.

References

External links
 
 
 

1978 films
1978 Western (genre) films
English-language Italian films
English-language Spanish films
Spaghetti Western films
Spanish Western (genre) films
Films directed by Monte Hellman
Films scored by Pino Donaggio
Films shot in Almería
1970s Italian films